Stroud is a town and civil parish in the county of Gloucestershire, England.

Stroud, Strouden or Strouds may also refer to:

Places
In the United Kingdom 
Stroud District, Gloucestershire
Stroud (UK Parliament constituency)
Stroud, Hampshire, near Petersfield
Strouden Park, Bournemouth, UK
Stroud, Surrey, a place in England

In the United States
Strouds, Georgia
Stroud, Oklahoma
Stroud Township, Monroe County, Pennsylvania
Strouds, West Virginia
Strouds, Wyoming

Elsewhere
Stroud, New South Wales, Australia
Stroud, Ontario, Canada

Other uses
Stroud (surname)
Stroud, a coarse woollen fabric as used in blankets and traded to Native Americans for use in garments

See also
Stroud Green, London, UK
Stroud Pound, a local currency in Stroud, Gloucestershire, England
Strood, a town in the unitary authority of Medway in South East England
Shroud, an item